The following is a list of dams in Yamagata Prefecture, Japan.

List

Notes

See also

References 

Yamagata